Amourah is a town and Latin Catholic titular bishopric in Algeria.

The commune lies in Djelfa Province. According to the 1998 census it has a population of 5,879.

History 
Amaura corresponds to ancient Sufasar,  a town in the Roman province of Mauretania Caesariensis during the Vandal Kingdom, Byzantine Empire and Roman Empire.

Titular bishopric 
Of this ancient diocese only one bishop is known, Reparato a Catholic, who intervened at the Conference of Carthage of 411, on that occasion the seat had no Donatist bishops.

An entry in the records of the Carthage Conference of 484  could, according to Mesnage, be a bishop of the town.

Today, Sufasar survives as a titular bishopric and the current bishop is Augustinus Kim Jong-soo, auxiliary bishop of Daejeon.
Reparato (fl.411)

No longer a residential bishopric, Amaura is today listed by the Catholic Church as a titular see, of the lowest (episcopal) rank.

Since the diocese was thus nominally restored in 1933, it has had the following non-consecutive incumbents :
 Étienne-Auguste-Germain Loosdregt, Missionary Oblates of Mary Immaculate (O.M.I.) (1952.03.13 – death 1980.11.13), as Apostolic Vicar of Vientiane (Laos) (1952.03.13 – resigned 1975) and President of Episcopal Conference of Laos and Cambodia (1964 – retired 1978)
 Norbert Werbs (1981.01.07 – death 2023.01.03), first as Auxiliary Bishop of North German Missions (Germany) (1981.01.07 – 1994.10.24), then Auxiliary Bishop emeritus of Hamburg (Germany) (1994.10.24 – retired 2015.05.20).

References

External links and sources 
 GCatholic

Catholic titular sees in Africa
Communes of Djelfa Province